Triphyophyllum  is a monotypic plant genus, containing the single species Triphyophyllum peltatum of the family Dioncophyllaceae. It is native to tropical western Africa, in Ivory Coast, Sierra Leone and Liberia, growing in tropical forests.

It is a liana, with a three-stage lifecycle, each with a different shaped leaf, as indicated by its Greek name. In the first stage, T. peltatum forms a rosette of simple lanceolate leaves with undulate margins. It then develops long, slender, glandular leaves, resembling those of the related Drosophyllum, which capture insects; one to three of these leaves in each rosette. T. peltatum is the largest of all confirmed carnivorous plants in the world, but its carnivorous nature did not become known until 1979, some 51 years after the plant's discovery. Most of the seed's development occurs outside the fruit. The fruit and seed develop from an orange flower with five incurved petals. As the seed dries out, its wide umbrella shape enables it to be transported on the wind.

Triphyophylum peltatum is currently cultivated in three botanical gardens: Abidjan, Bonn, and Würzburg. It is exceedingly rare in private collections.

References

 Bringmann, G., H. Rischer, J. Schlauer, K. Wolf, A. Kreiner, M. Duschek & L.A. Assi 2002.   Carnivorous Plant Newsletter 31(2): 44–52.
 Bringmann, G., J. Schlauer, K. Wolf, H. Rischer, U. Buschbom, A. Kreiner, F. Thiele, M. Duschek & L.A. Assi 1999.   Carnivorous Plant Newsletter 28(1): 7–13.
 Bringmann, G., M. Wenzel, H.P. Bringmann & J. Schlauer 2001.   Carnivorous Plant Newsletter 30(1): 15–21.
 Jonathan 1992.   Carnivorous Plant Newsletter 21(3): 51–53.
 Rice, B. 2007. Carnivorous plants with hybrid trapping strategies. Carnivorous Plant Newsletter 36(1): 23–27.
 Simons, P. 1981.   Carnivorous Plant Newsletter 10(3): 65–68, 79–80.

References

External links
The Carnivorous Plant FAQ: About Triphyophyllum

Caryophyllales
Carnivorous plants of Africa
Flora of Africa
Monotypic Caryophyllales genera